The members of the 12th General Assembly of Newfoundland were elected in the Newfoundland general election held in November 1874. The general assembly sat from 1875 to 1878.

The Conservative Party led by Frederick Carter formed the government. After Carter resigned in early 1878, William Whiteway became party leader and Premier.

Prescott Emerson was chosen as speaker, serving until 1877. James S. Winter succeeded Emerson as speaker.

Sir Stephen John Hill served as colonial governor of Newfoundland until 1876. Sir John Hawley Glover succeeded Hill as governor.

Members of the Assembly 
The following members were elected to the assembly in 1874:

Notes:

By-elections 
None

References 

Newfoundland
Terms of the General Assembly of Newfoundland and Labrador